This article is about the list of CS Mindelense players.  Clube Sportivo Mindelernse is a Cape Verdean football (soccer) club based in Mindelo, Cape Verde and plays at Estádio Municipal Adérito Sena.  The club was formed on 25 May 1922.

One of the greatest players were Adérito Carvalho da Sena and was one of the players that had the most appearance in club history, another greatest included Fredson Tavares.

List of players

Youth players

Notes

References

External links
List of CS Mindelense players at the official CS Mindelense website 

 
Mindelense
Association football player non-biographical articles